Geophagus neambi is a Geophagini cichlid native to the Tocantins River drainage in Brazil.

References 

Cichlid fish of South America
Geophagini
Fish of the Tocantins River basin